The World Nine-ball Championships are held annually, and are sanctioned by the World Pool-Billiard Association. The event was first held in 1990, won by Earl Strickland. Events have been held for boys, women and the main world championships since this time, with a girl's tournament being created in 2004. In 2013, the men's championship was changed from being inclusive for all to a men's only event. From 2021, the main tournament became all inclusive once again, while the women’s event was discontinued. In 1999, two men's tournaments were held, with one being run by the World Pool Association, held in Spain, and the other not recognised, held in Wales known as the 1999 World Pool Championship. However, both events were later recognised as official world championships for the year of 1999.

Men's champions

Women's champions

Junior champions
The first Junior Championships played since 1992 for boys, and a girls' division played since 2004.

Under-19

Boys

Girls

Under-17

Boys

Wheelchair champions

See also

References

External links
 World Pool-Billiards Association

 List of WPA World Nine-ball champions
WPA World Nine-ball champions
Champions
Nineball